Acanthurus japonicus is a tang from the Indo-West Pacific. It occasionally makes its way into the aquarium trade. It grows to a size of 21 cm in length. It is also known as Japan surgeonfish, white-faced surgeonfish, gold rim tang, powder brown tang and white-nose surgeonfish.

References

External links
 Acanthurus japonicus care sheet at FishGeeks
 

Acanthurus
Fish described in 1931